Bello Hayatu Gwarzo (born 14 April 1960) is a Nigerian politician who was a member of the Nigerian Senate from 1999 to 2015. He was the Senate Chief Whip from 2011 to 2015.

Background

Bello Hayatu Gwarzo was born in Gwarzo town, Kano State from the royal family of Hakimin Gwarzo, Sarkin Dawaki Maituta Abubakar on 14 April 1960. He has a National Diploma (Statistics) and is a banker by occupation.

Political career

Bello Hayatu Gwarzo was elected as senator in the 4th (1999–2003) and 5th (2003–2007) National Assemblies, representing Kano North Senatorial District. In April 2007 he ran again but was defeated by Aminu Sule Garo of the All Nigeria Peoples Party (ANPP). In December of that year, Garo's election was annulled on the grounds that he had faked his educational qualifications and Hayatu took his place.
Senator Gwarzo was made Chairman of Senate Committees on Labour, FCT and member of senate committees on Police Affairs, Millennium Development Goals and Appropriation.

At the Kano PDP congress in August 2009, Senator Gwarzo showed his support for the ex-governor Rabiu Kwankwaso, whose slate won complete control of the state party in a context against nominees of ex-governor Abubakar Rimi.

Gwarzo again ran for reelection as Senator for Kano North on the PDP platform in April 2011, and was again elected, winning  204,905 votes. He was later elected as the Chief Whip of the Senate from 2011 to 2015. Gwarzo again ran for reelection as Senator for Kano Noth on PDP platform in March, 2015  and was defeated by Barau Jibrinof the All people Congress.

References

1960 births
Living people
Nigerian Muslims
Peoples Democratic Party members of the Senate (Nigeria)
20th-century Nigerian politicians
21st-century Nigerian politicians